Chanovsky District is an administrative and municipal district (raion), one of the thirty in Novosibirsk Oblast, Russia. It is located in the west of the oblast. Its administrative center is the urban locality (a work settlement) of Chany. Population: 25,523 (2010 Census);  The population of Chany accounts for 33.2% of the district's total population.

Notable residents 

Zhanna Bolotova (born 1941), Soviet film actress, People's Artist of Russia

References

Notes

Sources

Districts of Novosibirsk Oblast